Loosely Exactly Nicole (stylized as *Loosely Exactly Nicole) is an American comedy streaming television series created by Christian Lander and Christine Zander that stars Nicole Byer and premiered on September 5, 2016, on MTV. After MTV cancelled the series, Facebook Watch picked up the show for a second season that premiered on December 20, 2017.

Premise

As MTV explains in a promotional release:

Cast and characters

Main
 Nicole Byer as herself, an aspiring actress and comedienne looking for her big break in show business
 Jacob Wysocki as Devin (season 2; recurring season 1), Nicole's roommate and best friend

Recurring
 Jen D'Angelo as Veronica, Nicole's closest girl friend
 Kevin Bigley as Derrick, a frequent hook-up of Nicole's
 Brandon Scott as Raymond
 Allyn Rachel as Avi 
 French Stewart as Donny
 Sasheer Zamata as Kim Whitfield, Nicole's childhood friend who runs a charitable organization
 Ayden Mayeri as Edi
 B. J. Britt as Josh, Nicole's boyfriend

Guests
 Kerri Kenney-Silver as Bernice ("Mistress")
 Nora Dunn as Nora McNab ("Danny Boom")
 Mary Birdsong as Madison ("Green Card")
 Noël Wells as Blix ("Big Break")
 Sheryl Lee Ralph as Lynette Rhodes ("Single Black Idol")

Episodes

Series overview

Season 1 (2016)

Season 2 (2017–18)

Production

Development
On April 21, 2016, it was announced that MTV had given the production a series order to consist of a first season of ten episodes. Executive producers were set to include Christine Zander, Christian Lander, and Avi Gilbert. Zander was also set to act as showrunner.

Cancellation
On February 9, 2017, it was announced that MTV had cancelled the series after one season. The show was cancelled alongside Mary + Jane, both of which had been developed and picked up before Chris McCarthy took over MTV in late October as president of MTV, VH1 and Logo.

Renewal
On June 12, 2017, it was announced that Facebook Watch had saved the series from cancellation and renewed it for a second season to consist of ten episodes. Christine Zander and Avi Gilbert returned as executive producer but a deal could not be reached with Christian Lander, who did not ultimately return for season two.

Reception
The first season of the show received a mixed reception from critics upon its premiere. In a positive review, Flavorwire's Lara Zarum described the show as "a sweetly raunchy fable about finding your voice." She also praised the series for addressing "race and gender with a light but sharp touch." In a more negative review, Mitchel Broussard of WeGotThisCovered.com gave the series two-and-a-half stars out of five and commented that, "Although it has the noblest of inclusive intentions, Loosely Exactly Nicole ultimately falls flat because it doesn't present its progressive ideas in intriguing ways and - most problematic - it just isn't very funny." Common Sense Media's Melissa Camacho criticized the show when saying, "Nicole Byer's comic abilities are evident, but the show's writing is more silly than smart. As a result, it contains scenes (such as one that presents an Asian child in blackface) that cross the line from being politically charged to just being dim and offensive. Overall, the show has a lot of potential but doesn't quite reach it."

See also

 List of original programs distributed by Facebook Watch

References

External links
 
 

2010s American comedy television series
2016 American television series debuts
2018 American television series endings
American television series revived after cancellation
English-language television shows
Facebook Watch original programming
MTV original programming